M. darwini may refer to:

Mallada darwini
Masoniella darwini
Megalomus darwini
Mesocyclops darwini, a copepod crustacean species in the genus Mesocyclops
Microdontomerus darwini
Minihippus darwini
Mycale darwini
Myllocerus darwini
Mylodon darwini, an extinct giant ground sloth species
Mysteria darwini

See also
 M. darwinii (disambiguation)
 Darwini (disambiguation)